Union Township is one of twenty townships in Fayette County, Iowa, USA.  As of the 2010 census, its population was 412.

It was previously called West Union township.

Geography
According to the United States Census Bureau, Union Township covers an area of 33.67 square miles (87.2 square kilometers).

The city of West Union is entirely within this township geographically but is a separate entity.

Adjacent townships
Dover Township (north)
Clermont Township (northeast)
Pleasant Valley Township (east)
Illyria Township (southeast)
Westfield Township (south)
Center Township (southwest)
Windsor Township (west)
Auburn Township (northwest)

Cemeteries
The township contains these five cemeteries: Barnhouse, Butler, Mount Calvary, Mount Pleasant and Pleasant Grove.

Major highways
  U.S. Route 18
  Iowa Highway 56
  Iowa Highway 150

Airports and landing strips
 George L Scott Municipal Airport
 Scott Field Municipal Airport

Landmarks
 Echo Valley State Park
 Volga River State Recreation Area (partial)

School districts
 North Fayette Valley Community School District

Political districts
 Iowa's 1st congressional district
 State House District 18
 State Senate District 9

References
 United States Census Bureau 2008 TIGER/Line Shapefiles
 United States Board on Geographic Names (GNIS)
 United States National Atlas

External links
 US-Counties.com
 City-Data.com

Townships in Fayette County, Iowa
Townships in Iowa